Amphetamine Reptile Records (or AmRep Industries) is a record label founded in 1986 by Tom Hazelmyer in Washington state. The label specializes in noise rock and also released Strap It On, the debut album by alternative metal band  Helmet which sold more than 40,000 records. According to Hazelmyer, the success of the album was vital to keeping AmRep going throughout the 1990s, as it "helped support the other things that sold less." The label was the subject of the 2015 documentary The Color of Noise.

History
Hazelmyer originally started the label to release records by his band, Halo of Flies. Eventually the label's roster expanded to include releases by Helmet, Melvins, Cows, Helios Creed, Chokebore, Servotron and others. Hazelmyer later moved the label to Minneapolis. Today the label is used by the Melvins, H•O•F and other legacy AmRep acts to release limited edition vinyl. These releases are generally noted for their Linocut artwork, hand carved by Hazelmyer, their limited availability and their highly sought after nature as collector's items.

Much of the AmRep back catalog is now out of print, although many of the releases are available in digital download format and streaming.

On May 13, 2020 Tom Hazelmyer participated in an in-depth interview about the label on Conan Neutron's Protonic Reversal.

Artists

 Bailter Space
 Boredoms
 Boss Hog
 Brainiac
 Calvin Krime
 Chokebore
 Cosmic Psychos
 Cows
 Dwarves
 feedtime
 Gas Huffer
 Gaunt
 God Bullies
 godheadSilo
 Halo of Flies/H•O•F
 Hammerhead
 Helios Creed
 Helmet
 The Heroine Sheiks
 Janitor Joe
 Jawbox
 Killdozer
 King Snake Roost
 lowercase
 Lubricated Goat
 Melvins
 Mudhoney
 Nashville Pussy
 Negative Approach
 Servotron
 Steel Pole Bath Tub
 Strapping Fieldhands
 Surgery
 Superchunk
 Supernova
 Tad
 Tar
 The Jesus Lizard
 Thee Headcoats
 Thee Mighty Caesars
 The Thrown Ups
 The U-Men
 The Urinals
 Today is the Day
 Unsane
 Vertigo
 X

Notable performances
Cosmic Psychos / Hammerhead / Surgery / Cows / Melvins / Helmet - the CMJ / Amphetamine Reptile Tour - Friday, October 30, 1992, at The Ritz

Discography

See also
 List of record labels

References

External links
 Archive of official site
 |||861 Allmusic.com listing of releases
 2013 Audio interview with Thomas Hazelmyer

American independent record labels
Record labels established in 1986
Alternative rock record labels
Independent record labels based in Minnesota
Experimental music record labels
Indie rock record labels
Noise music record labels
Punk record labels
1986 establishments in Washington (state)